Tomaž Humar (February 18, 1969 – ), nicknamed Gozdni Joža (akin to Hillbilly), was a Slovenian mountaineer. A father of two, Humar lived in Kamnik, Slovenia. He completed over 1500 ascents, and won a number of mountaineering and other awards, including the Piolet d'Or in 1996 for his Ama Dablam ascent.

Climbing career

Humar became widely recognized in 1999 after his solo ascent of the south face of Dhaulagiri, considered one of the deadliest routes in the Himalayas with a 40% fatality rate.

During a solo attempt to climb Nanga Parbat in 2005, Humar became trapped by avalanches and melting snow at an altitude of nearly 6000 meters. After six days in a snow cave he was rescued by a Pakistan Army helicopter crew on August 10, 2005: Lieutenant Colonel Rashid Ulah Baig and Major Khalid Amir Rana.

On October 28, 2007, Humar reached the Eastern summit of Annapurna I, via a route at the far eastern end of the South Face.

On November 9, 2009, Humar, who was on a solo climb via the South Face of Langtang Lirung (last climbed in 1995), had an accident during the descent. His only contact with the base camp staff via a satellite phone was made on the day of the accident and he appeared to be in critical condition with leg, spine and rib injuries.

Prominent expeditions

13. November 1994: Ganesh V (6770 m), in Ganesh Himal, new variation on SE face, with Stane Belak-Šrauf
6. May 1995: Annapurna (8091 m), N face, French Route, solo climb (the only traditional expedition in which he participated)
4. May 1996: Ama Dablam (6828 m), new route on NW face, with Vanja Furlan
2. November 1996: Bobaye (6808 m), 1st ascent of the summit, NW face, new route "Golden Heart", solo climb
1. October 1997: Lobuche East (6119 m), NE face, new route "Talking About Tsampa", with Janez Jeglič and Carlos Carsolio
9-11. October 1997: Pumori (7165 m), SE face attempt of new route up to 6300 m - then after participation in rescue action at N reached the summit by normal route), with Janez Jeglič, Marjan Kovač
31. October 1997: Nuptse West top (NW, 7742 m), W face, new route, with Janez Jeglič (who died during descent)
26. October 1998: El Capitan (2307 m) (Yosemite), route Reticent Wall A4-A5, 3rd solo climb (1st solo by non-American)
2. November 1999: Dhaulagiri (8167 m), new route on S face (up to 8000 m, without reaching the top), solo climb
26. October 2002: Shisha Pangma, (8046 m), with Maxut Zhumaiev, Denis Urubko, Aleksej Raspopov, Vassiliy Pivtsov
June 2003: Nanga Parbat (8125 m), his first attempt to climb Rupal (S) Face, up to ca. 6000 m
22. December 2003: Aconcagua (6960 m), S face, new route with Aleš Koželj
October 2004: Jannu (7711 m), E face, attempt solo up to 7000 m
23. April 2005: Cholatse (6440 m), NE face 2nd ascent with new variation, with Aleš Koželj, Janko Oprešnik
Aug 2005: Nanga Parbat (8125 m), attempt to solo climb Rupal (S) Face, up to 7000 meters (with famous helicopter rescue action - see main text above)
October 2006: Baruntse (7129 m), W face of SE ridge, solo
28. October 2007: Annapurna (8091 m), S face, new route, solo climb
 (ca.) 8. November 2009: Langtang Lirung (7227 m), S face solo attempt, died during descent

Bibliography
 Tomaz Humar: Black Rock. The Northwest Face of Bobaye. "American Alpine Journal", Vol. 1997, pp. 17–18
 Tomaz Humar: Nuptse West Face. "American Alpine Journal", Vol. 1998, pp. 3–10
 Tomaž Humar: Ni nemogočih poti. Mobitel, Ljubljana 2001.  , 207 pages
 Tomaž Humar: No Impossible Ways (transl. Tamara Soban). Mobitel, Ljubljana 2001., 104 pages

Further reading
 Bernadette McDonald (2008).  Tomaž Humar.  Hutchinson, London, UK. 

References

External links
Tomaž Humar website
Tomaž Humar website: Expeditions
National Geographic on incredible Nanga Parbat rescue
Tomaž Humar dies in Langtang Lirung 
Tomaž Humar final rescue attempt
Tomaz Humar - Daily Telegraph obituary
Tomaz Humar Dies on Langtang Lirung - Climbing Magazine detailed obituary by Dougald MacDonald

1969 births
2009 deaths
Mountaineering deaths
Slovenian mountain climbers
Sport deaths in Nepal
Sportspeople from Ljubljana
People from Kamnik
Piolet d'Or winners